The arrondissement of Évry is an arrondissement of France in the Essonne department in the Île-de-France region. It has 51 communes.

Composition

The communes of the arrondissement of Évry, and their INSEE codes, are:

 Auvernaux (91037)
 Ballancourt-sur-Essonne (91045)
 Boigneville (91069)
 Bondoufle (91086)
 Boussy-Saint-Antoine (91097)
 Brunoy (91114)
 Buno-Bonnevaux (91121)
 Champcueil (91135)
 Chevannes (91159)
 Corbeil-Essonnes (91174)
 Courances (91180)
 Courdimanche-sur-Essonne (91184)
 Crosne (91191)
 Dannemois (91195)
 Draveil (91201)
 Écharcon (91204)
 Épinay-sous-Sénart (91215)
 Étiolles (91225)
 Évry-Courcouronnes (91228)
 Fleury-Mérogis (91235)
 Fontenay-le-Vicomte (91244)
 Gironville-sur-Essonne (91273)
 Grigny (91286)
 Le Coudray-Montceaux (91179)
 Lisses (91340)
 Maisse (91359)
 Mennecy (91386)
 Milly-la-Forêt (91405)
 Moigny-sur-École (91408)
 Montgeron (91421)
 Morsang-sur-Orge (91434)
 Morsang-sur-Seine (91435)
 Nainville-les-Roches (91441)
 Oncy-sur-École (91463)
 Ormoy (91468)
 Prunay-sur-Essonne (91507)
 Quincy-sous-Sénart (91514)
 Ris-Orangis (91521)
 Saint-Germain-lès-Corbeil (91553)
 Saint-Pierre-du-Perray (91573)
 Saintry-sur-Seine (91577)
 Soisy-sur-École (91599)
 Soisy-sur-Seine (91600)
 Tigery (91617)
 Varennes-Jarcy (91631)
 Vert-le-Grand (91648)
 Vert-le-Petit (91649)
 Vigneux-sur-Seine (91657)
 Villabé (91659)
 Viry-Châtillon (91687)
 Yerres (91691)

History

The arrondissement of Évry was created in 1966 as part of the department Seine-et-Oise. In 1968 it became part of the new department Essonne.

As a result of the reorganisation of the cantons of France which came into effect in 2015, the borders of the cantons are no longer related to the borders of the arrondissements. The cantons of the arrondissement of Évry were, as of January 2015:

 Brunoy
 Corbeil-Essonnes-Est
 Corbeil-Essonnes-Ouest
 Draveil
 Épinay-sous-Sénart
 Évry-Nord
 Évry-Sud
 Grigny
 Mennecy
 Milly-la-Forêt
 Montgeron
 Morsang-sur-Orge
 Ris-Orangis
 Saint-Germain-lès-Corbeil
 Vigneux-sur-Seine
 Viry-Châtillon
 Yerres

References

Evry